The Guadalimar is a river of the Iberian Peninsula, a right-bank tributary of the Guadalquivir. Its 180-km long course spans across the Spanish provinces of Albacete and Jaén.

References 

Rivers of Spain
Rivers of the Province of Albacete
Rivers of Andalusia
Guadalquivir